Hrbatý is a Czech and Slovak surname. Notable people with the surname include:

 Dominik Hrbatý, Slovak tennis player
 Jan Hrbatý, Czech ice hockey player

See also
 

Czech-language surnames
Slovak-language surnames